Edwin Arthur Gibson (June 2, 1926 – November 20, 2011) was an American architect active in Indianapolis, Indiana from 1946 to 2002.  His career was one of many firsts. Gibson was the first registered African American architect in the State of Indiana, first African-American architect to be appointed Indiana's State Architect, and first African-American architect in Indiana to own his own firm. His long career included work in both the public and private sector. Gibson overcame many obstacles to become successful and was generous in offering advice and helping younger architects achieve similar success.

Personal life
Gibson was born on June 2, 1925, in Cumberland, Maryland, and as a youth he moved to Indianapolis, Indiana, where he graduated from Crispus Attucks High School. He went on to graduate in the top five percent of his class at University of Illinois where he received a Bachelors and Masters of Science in Architectural Engineering. Gibson married Mary E. Gibson, and together they had two sons, Edwin A. Gibson, Jr. and Gary A. Gibson, and one daughter, Eve M. Williams. The Gibsons were grandparents to five grandsons: Edwin A. Gibson, Elliott A. Gibson, Jason P. Gibson, Delford G. Williams IV, and Brenton P. Williams, and two step-granddaughters: Laura E. Hanley and Melinda L. Hanley from their daughter-in-law Elizabeth Booth-Gibson. Edwin A. Gibson died in Danville, Indiana on November 20, 2011, at the age of 86. He was buried in Crown Hill Cemetery in Indianapolis, Indiana.

Practice
His long career, which spanned from 1945 to 2002, included work in both the public and private sectors. He started at the venerable A. M. Strauss Associates, Inc., a Fort Wayne architecture firm, where he became a partner and treasurer in the firm. He later moved to Indianapolis to start his own firm. In 1962, Gibson won the Governor's Award for Outstanding Achievement, a year later, in 1963 he was appointed as Indiana State Architect, a position he held for two years, leaving in 1965 to work for Chas. W. Cole & Son, as the Architect-Director in charge of the Indianapolis office. The same year, the Indiana Society of Architects, AIA, honored Gibson with a recognition of meritorious service, which was presented to him on October 8, 1965.

Gibson opened his own firm (Ed Gibson & Associates, Inc.), a general architecture and engineering company, in 1968. The company was in operation until 1986 when he dissolved the company, and left to work exclusively for Methodist Hospital. After leaving Methodist Hospital, Gibson worked as a consulting architect until his retirement in 2002. Some of the buildings he designed or renovated were located at Methodist Hospital in Indianapolis, Evansville State Hospital, Central Elementary in Plainfield, Broad Ripple Library, renovations at Central Library in Indianapolis, IUPUI, IU Bloomington, including renovation of Ernie Pyle Hall, Hudnut Plaza, and other HUD projects throughout Indiana.
 
When Gibson closed his private practice in 1987 to work exclusively for Methodist Hospital, most of the drawings in his office were discarded and those in this archival collection are the few examples of his work that remain. Shortly after his death in 2011, his family gave an additional donation of photographs and papers, including his Master of Science thesis, awards, and certificates to the Ball State University Drawings and Documents Archive. The family also donated Gibson's personal tape measure engraved with his initials, which can be viewed in the digital collection.

Works
Arsenal Technical School 1500 East Michigan Avenue, Indianapolis, IN, c.1970s
Broad Ripple Library, Broad Ripple Avenue, Indianapolis, IN, 1984
Century Towers, 100 North Court Street, Sullivan, IN, 1981
Methodist Hospital, West Building, North Senate Avenue, Indianapolis, IN, c.1970s
Indianapolis Central Library Renovation, 40 East St. Clair Street, Indianapolis, IN, 1977
Evansville State Hospital, 150 bed Residential Care Unit, 3400 Lincoln Avenue, Evansville, IN, c.1970s
Herron Art Museum Building Renovation, 735 West New York Street, Indianapolis, IN c.1970
Central Elementary School, Plainfield, IN, c.1970s

References

1926 births
2011 deaths
Architects from Maryland
Architects from Indianapolis
20th-century American architects
African-American architects
Burials at Crown Hill Cemetery
Indiana University people
University of Illinois alumni
20th-century African-American artists
21st-century African-American people
Architects from Cumberland, Maryland